Nigel Stafford-Clark (born 12 June 1948) is a British film and television producer, and the brother of the theatre director Max Stafford-Clark.  He was educated at Felsted and Trinity College, Cambridge, and worked in advertising and in sponsored documentaries before becoming a commercials producer at Moving Picture Company (MPC).

In the buildup to the launch of Channel 4 in November 1982, he formed MPC's programme department, executive producing a number of documentary series for the new channel, including one of its earliest hits Tom Keating on Painters.  He also produced several television films for the Film on Four strand, including Last Day of Summer, written by Ian McEwan from his own short story, and The House, the debut drama from writer-director and People Show alumnus Mike Figgis.  He moved on to feature films in the mid-80s, including The Assam Garden, in which Deborah Kerr gave a highly acclaimed performance in what would be her last feature, and Stormy Monday, in which Mike Figgis made an immediate impact as writer and director of his first.

In 1988, Stafford-Clark moved to Zenith Productions, the independent drama production company whose feature film credits included Prick Up Your Ears, Wish You Were Here, Sid and Nancy and The Hit, and whose television productions included Inspector Morse and Hamish Macbeth.  During his time there he produced a number of television and feature films, amongst them the highly controversial and award-winning Shoot to Kill (1990), the drama debut of documentary film-maker Peter Kosminsky, which told the story of the Stalker Inquiry in Northern Ireland.

In 1998 Stafford-Clark left Zenith to form his own production company, Deep Indigo, winning the BAFTA for Best Drama Serial three times between 1999 and 2005 with productions for the BBC.  Warriors (1999), written by Leigh Jackson, reunited him with director Peter Kosminsky and dealt with the brutal realities facing young British soldiers on peacekeeping duties in Bosnia.  The Way We Live Now (2001), the first of three projects with writer Andrew Davies, was directed by David Yates and starred David Suchet as Anthony Trollope's rogue Augustus Melmotte.  This was followed by a second Trollope adaptation He Knew He Was Right (2003) directed by Tom Vaughan, and then by Bleak House (2005).  This eight-hour adaptation of the novel by Charles Dickens was shown in the UK twice weekly in half-hour episodes (after an initial hour), inspired by the episodic publication of the original novel. It was directed by Justin Chadwick and Susanna White, with Gillian Anderson and Charles Dance leading a cast of over 65.

In March 2008 Stafford-Clark's production The Passion was broadcast on BBC One.  It told the story of Jesus from his entry into Jerusalem on Palm Sunday to his Crucifixion and the events which followed.  Written by Frank Deasy and directed by Michael Offer, it was stripped across Holy Week in four peak-time episodes.

More recently Stafford-Clark produced Titanic, a four-hour serial for ITV in the UK written by Julian Fellowes, that took a fresh look at the sinking of the Titanic for the one hundredth anniversary in April 2012.  Filming was completed in mid-July 2011 at the Stern Studios in Budapest. The UK/Hungary/Canada co-production was sold to 160 countries, including the ABC Network in the USA, TF1 in France and ZDF in Germany, and won the 2013 TV BAFTA for Best Visual Effects. His most recent production is Press, a six part drama series for BBC One and PBS Masterpiece Theatre, written by Mike Bartlett (Dr Foster, King Charles III) and directed by Tom Vaughan.

He is a fellow of the Royal Society of Arts

External links 
 

1948 births
Alumni of Trinity College, Cambridge
British television producers
British film producers
Living people
People from Bromley